Escalante is a city in central Garfield County, Utah, United States, located along the Utah Scenic Byway 12 (SR-12) in the south-central part of the state. As of the 2010 census, 797 people were living in the city.

The city is named after Silvestre Vélez de Escalante, a Franciscan missionary and a member of the first European expedition into southern Utah.

The Escalante Petrified Forest State Park is located west of the city. Sections of the Grand Staircase–Escalante National Monument (GSENM) abut much of the city's limits. The road leads to the Canyons of the Escalante, the Devils Garden and the Hole-in-the-Rock.

History
In 1776, Silvestre Vélez de Escalante and Francisco Atanasio Domínguez left Santa Fe, New Mexico attempting to find a route to the missions of California. The Dominguez–Escalante Expedition followed a route north through western Colorado, west across central Utah, and then southwest through what is now called the Escalante Desert, finally circling back to the east after reaching Arizona near the north rim of the Grand Canyon. They returned to Santa Fe having never entered California or the areas near the city of Escalante. In 1866; Captain James Andrus led members of the Southern Utah militia through the Escalante area during the Black Hawk Indian War. The valley east of the Escalante Mountains, where the city of Escalante is located, was named Potato Valley since the group had found wild potatoes growing there.

Settlers from Panguitch first visited the area in the 1870s, where they met members of the John Wesley Powell expedition. The settlement was named based on a suggestion of Powell's group to honor Escalante even though the expedition had not traveled into the valley. In June 1875, the settlers returned to survey the valley. Twenty-acre parcels were staked out for farming while city lots were also marked. After a winter spent back in Panguitch, the settlers returned, and the first home was built in March 1876 by William Alvey. The first settlers built many homes using native bricks, and as a result, those homes are still standing today.

The primary industries of the new settlement of Escalante were cattle and sheep ranching, dairy farming, logging and mining. Farming and ranching continue to drive the local economy today, along with increasing tourist-related activities. In the 1930s, the Civilian Conservation Corps (CCC) built improved roads to Posey Lake and Boulder. Federal government management of large tracts of surrounding lands had begun, and stricter regulation of public lands combined with limited private land resources caused many people to leave Escalante in the 1940s.

The exodus to look for work in larger communities resulted in a loss of 33% of the population by the 1950 census. The population continued to decline through the next two decades, dropping to as low as 638 people, leaving only 15 more people than in the very first census in 1880. An increase of 25% by the 1990 census was followed by no change in the 2000 census and a slight decline in the 2010 census.

Since the Grand Staircase–Escalante National Monument (GSENM) was established in 1996, Escalante has seen a large increase in the number of tourists, especially in the spring through fall months. A survey taken from March to October 2004 by Utah State University claims that the BLM has an estimated 600,000 visitors to various parts of GSENM, many of whom pass through Escalante.

Demographics

As of the 2010 census, 797 people, 334 households, and 217 families lived in the city. The population density was 271 people per square mile (105/km2). There were 420 housing units at an average density of 143 per square mile (55/km2). The racial makeup was 95.4% White, 2.1% American Indian and Alaska Native, 0.5% Asian, 0.1% Black, 0.1% Native Hawaiian, 1.5% from other races, 0.3% from mixed racial ancestry and 3.5% Hispanic or Latino of any race.

There were 334 households, out of which 22.2% had children under the age of 18 living with them, 57.2% were married couples living together, 4.8% had a female householder with no husband present, 3% had a male householder with no wife present, and 35% were non-families. 30.2% of all households were made up of individuals, and 12% had someone living alone who was 65 years or older. The average household size was 2.39, and the average family size was 3.03.

The population was spread out, with 22.1% under 18, 8.5% from 18 to 24, 9.7% from 25 to 34, 17.7% from 35 to 49, 24.2% from 50 to 64, and 17.8% who were 65 years of age or older. The median age was 44.9 years. For every 100 females, there were 109.2 males. For every 100 females age 18 and over, there were 101.6 males.

The median yearly income for a household was $38,929, and the median income for a family was $48,654. Males had a median income of $51,223 versus $27,500 for females. The per capita income was $27,648. About 14.5% of families and 14.8% of the population were below the poverty line ($11,490 for a single person household as of 2013) including 2.5% of those under age 18 and 25.3% of those age 65 or over.

Geography

According to the United States Census Bureau, the city has a total area of 2.944 square miles (7.625 km2), all land.

The mountains surround Escalante, cliffs, flats, washes and sandstone canyons of the Grand Staircase–Escalante National Monument (GSENM) and the Dixie National Forest.

The city lies within the Potato Valley as designated on the official USGS map. The Escalante River flows from the west, passing by the north side of the city and continuing eastward by an area named Big Flat. To the southeast of the city is the Canyons of the Escalante, the eastern part of GSENM, while directly south of the city is the Straight Cliffs formation which runs south-southeast to Lake Powell. The Kaiparowits Plateau, the middle part of GSENM, lies to the south and southwest of the city. To the city's west are the Dixie National Forest and the Escalante Mountains. To the city's north is a small part of GSENM, as well as the Box-Death Hollow Wilderness and the Aquarius Plateau, which are parts of the Dixie National Forest.

Climate
Escalante has a cold semi-arid (steppe) climate, type "BSk" in the Köppen climate classification system. Snow falls mainly from November to April, with trace amounts occurring in October.

Daytime high to nighttime low-temperature ranges are approximately 26 °F (14 °C) in the winter months to 37 °F (20 °C) in midsummer.

The current weather forecast is available in the External links section.

See also

 List of cities and towns in Utah

References

External links

 
 Current weather forecast
 Depression Era photos of Escalante at the Library of Congress

Cities in Garfield County, Utah
Grand Staircase–Escalante National Monument
Populated places established in 1875
1875 establishments in Utah Territory
Cities in Utah